The 2007 Macau Grand Prix (formally the 54th Polytec Macau Grand Prix) was a motor race for Formula Three cars that was held on the streets of Macau on 18 November 2007. Unlike other races, such as the Masters of Formula 3, the 2007 Macau Grand Prix was not a part of any Formula Three championship, but was open to entries from all Formula Three championships. The race itself was made up of two races: a ten-lap qualifying race that decided the starting grid for the fifteen-lap main race. The 2007 race was the 54th running of the Macau Grand Prix and the 25th for Formula Three cars.

The Grand Prix was won by TOM'S driver Oliver Jarvis, having won the event's Qualification Race the previous afternoon. Jarvis started from pole position and led the majority of the race meeting which included every lap of the main race to take his first and only victory in Macau. Second place went to Koudai Tsukakoshi of Manor Motorsport, while the podium was completed by another Japanese driver and Jarvis's TOM's teammate Kazuya Oshima.

Background and entry list 

The Macau Grand Prix is a Formula Three race considered to be a stepping stone to higher motor racing categories such as Formula One and has been termed the territory's most prestigious international sporting event. The 2007 Macau Grand Prix was the 54th running of the event and the 25th time the race was held to Formula Three regulations. It took place on the  22-turn Guia Circuit on 18 November 2007 with three preceding days of practice and qualifying.

In order to compete in Macau, drivers had to compete in a Fédération Internationale de l'Automobile (FIA)-regulated championship meeting during the calendar year, in either the FIA Formula 3 International Trophy or one of the domestic championships, with the highest-placed drivers given priority in receiving an invitation to the meeting. Within the 30-car grid of the event, each of the major Formula Three series were represented by their respective champion. Romain Grosjean, the Formula Three Euro Series champion, was joined in Macau by British champion Marko Asmer, German series winner Carlo van Dam and Japanese champion Kazuya Oshima. Six drivers outside of Formula Three accepted invitations from the Macau Grand Prix Committee to compete in the Macau Grand Prix: GP2 Series driver Bruno Senna, Brendon Hartley of the Eurocup Formula Renault 2.0, and Macau natives Lei Kit Meng, Michael Ho, Rodolfo Ávila and Jo Merszei.

Practice and qualifying

A total of two half hour practice sessions preceded the Sunday race: one on Thursday morning and one on Friday morning. Grosjean set the fastest time for ASM in the opening practice session with a late lap of 2 minutes, 14.223 seconds, nearly one-tenth of a second faster than anyone else in spite of heavy damage to his car's left-hand side in avoiding Stephen Jelley's stricken vehicle at Policeman's Bend. His closest challenger was Sébastien Buemi in second in front of third-placed Asmer. Prema Powerteam's Roberto Streit, Koudai Tsukakoshi, Edoardo Mortara, Oliver Jarvis, Jelley, Senna and Nico Hülkenberg rounded out the session's top ten drivers. The session was stopped halfway through when Franck Mailleux spun into a barriera lining the track at the R Bend and his car was stranded on the track. Other incidents included Lei spinning at Lisboa corner but avoided damage to his car. Sam Bird later swiped the turn's wall and Walter Grubmüller limped to the pit lane with his front-right suspension bent.

Qualifying was divided into two 45-minute sessions; the first was held on Thursday afternoon, and the second on Friday afternoon. The fastest time set by each driver from either session counted towards his final starting position for the qualification race. The first qualifying session had Asmer come out on top with a time of 2 minutes, 13.122 seconds set with nine minutes remaining. The heavy damage to Grosjean's car forced him to sit out the session's opening minutes and gradually improved to be two-tenths behind and take provisional second. Despite clipping the wall Yelmer Buurman ran strongly throughout and finished in third place. Buemi battled for pole position for the majority of the session before falling to fourth. Esteban Guerrieri improved late on to end up fifth in front of Tsukakoshi in sixth and 2006 pole sitter Kamui Kobayashi in seventh. James Jakes, Streit and Jelley rounded out the top ten. Although he was at one point high up as fourth Jarvis was the quickest driver not to reach the top ten. Following him were the highest-placed rookie Mortara, Oshima with Hülkenberg provisionally joining the Japanese driver on the seventh row in spite of a collision against a tyre barrier at Lisboa corner. Niall Breen was next up ahead of Atte Mustonen, Jonathan Kennard, Van Dam, Renger van der Zande and Senna. The rest of the order was completed Bird, Mailleux, Hartley, Grubmüller, Takuya Izawa, Ávila, Ho, Lei. Cheong Lou Meng and the only driver to fail to record within 110 per cent of Asmer was Merszei. Other incidents that occurred were Mustonen damaging his suspension against the tyre wall and Bird went into the barrier at Fisherman's Bend. Senna crashed against a tyre barrier at San Francisco Bend and Izawa hit him, prompted red flags to stop the session. After qualifying, numerous penalties were imposed. Kobayashi and Mutstonen incurred three-place grid penalties for moving onto the fast lane of the pit lane before it was declared open. Hülkenberg and Cheong were similarly penalised for ignoring the red light signal at the end of the pit lane which mandated them to enter the weighbridge.

In the second 30-minute practice session, Asmer spent much of the session evaluating a new car setup that improved straightline speed and posted the fastest lap of 2 minutes, 12.894 seconds. Tsukakoshi ended the session second-fastest and 0.038 seconds behind Asmer. Jarvis ran consistently near the top of the time sheets and was third. Mortara, Oshima, Grosjean, Buemi, Streit, Jelley and Van Dam occupied positions four to ten. Although no red flags were necessitated during the session, several drivers came unstuck. Mailleux spun at Lisboa corner and broke his rear wing. Mustonen continued after a spin at the R Bend but later crashed at Lisboa after colliding with another vehicle. Jakes prematurely ended his session in a barrier at Moorish Hill with 11 minutes remaining.

The second qualifying session began fifteen minutes later than scheduled due to freight for the Guia Race of Macau being stranded in Beijing, and was further delayed by crashes in the local touring car support races. When the session did start, Jarvis set the early pace before he was eclipsed by Tsukakoshi one minute before the conclusion of second qualifying. This was immediately bettered by Jarvis with a lap of 2 minutes, 11.696 which he held to secure pole position for the qualifying race. Amser set his best time on his last lap to join Jarvis on the front row of the grid. Tsukakoshi was 0.216 seconds adrift in third place. Buemi remained in fourth position with Mortara moving to fifth. Grosjean's fell to sixth while teammate Kobayashi similarly lost ground and took seventh. The top ten was completed by Oshima, Streit and Buurman. Behind them the rest of the field consisted of Jakes, Guerrieri, Jelley, Van Dam, Hülkenberg, Bird, Breen, Senna, Kennard, Mustonen, Hartley, Mailleux, Van Der Zande, Izawa, Ho, Ávila, Grubmüller, Cheong, Lei and Merszei. The session was halted three times: Van Der Zande crashed into the barrier leaving Paiol corner and littered debris across the track. Hartley struck the wall at the exit of Lisboa turn and his car was stranded in a dangerous position. The final stoppage was for Grubmüller who hit the barrier on his out-lap. Buemi and Buurman each received penalties after second qualifying: Buemi was summoned to the stewards office for a review of his fastest lap and they felt his attempt was recorded under yellow flag conditions. Thus, Buemi was demoted five places on the grid. Buurman dropped three positions after he was adjudged to have moved onto the fast lane of the pit lane before it was declared open.

Qualifying classification
Each of the driver's fastest lap times from the two qualifying sessions are denoted in bold.

Notes:
  – Sébastien Buemi was penalised five places on the grid because of him ignoring yellow flags.
  – Kamui Kobayashi, Atte Mustonen and Yelmer Buurman were penalised by overspeeding in the pit lane and demoted three places on the grid.

Qualifying race

The qualifying race to set the grid order for the main race started on 17 November at 13:20 Macau Standard Time (UTC+08:00). The weather at the start of the qualifying race was dry and sunny with the air temperature  and the track temperature . Kobayashi failed to take the start because he stalled in his grid slot. On the grid, pole position starter Jarvis made a brisk getaway but Asmer—despite initial fears he would lose grip of his clutch—accelerated quicker and progressed to the lead heading towards Mandarin Bend. Further back, separate crashes involving multiple cars prompted the deployment of the safety car. Mortara had a slow getaway and then made contact with Buemi at Lisboa corner and Tsukakoshi was caught up in the melee. Tsukakoshi survived the impact and rejoined the race but Grosjean picked up a puncture, causing Senna to swerve in avoidance. Grosjean drove slowly to pit lane for a replacement wheel but fell a lap behind Asmer. The crash moved Bird from fifteenth to fifth and Oshima was now sixth but Guerrieri's race ended early when he crashed as well. Cheong and Lei went into the pit lane for debris removal and a replacement front wing respectively.

The safety car was withdrawn after three laps and racing resumed with Asmer leading. Jarvis remained close by as he hoped to overtake on the following lap at Lisboa corner. As Van Der Zande crossed the start/finish line to continue racing, he attempted to pass Kennard. Van Der Zande could not pass and drifted into the wall at Lisboa turn while Kennard resumed without trouble. Ho then made a pit stop and retired soon after. On the fifth lap, Jarvis slipstreamed onto the back of Asmer heading down the main straight and passed him on the outside for the lead at Lisboa corner. Two laps later, Senna passed Hülkenberg and started to close the gap to Buurmann. Hülkenberg then tried to overtook Senna to reclaim the position but lost control of his car and glanced the barrier at the Mandarin Bend corner. Both he and Senna were forced into retirement. Localised yellow flags were waved which neutralised racing in that section of the circuit because debris was scattered across the tarmac surface.

None of these issues bothered Jarvis who at this point established a small but healthy lead over Asmer, who in turn, maintained a comfortable margin over Oshima. Jakes and Buurman followed in fourth and fifth. As the field began the penultimate lap, Mustonen pushed hard but he struck the outside tyre barrier at Fisherman's Bend, removing both his rear wheels. His car was stranded in the centre of the track. The result of Mustonen's accident ended the qualifying race early and the race result was counted back two laps. This gave Jarvis the victory and pole position for the Grand Prix itself. He was joined on the front row by Asmer. Oshima completed the podium in third position, ahead of the British duo of Jakes and Bird. The final finishers were Buurman, Jelley, Streit, Tsukakoshi, Breen, Kennard, Hartley, Mailleux, Mustonen, Van Dam, Grubmüller, Ávila, Izawa, Merszei, Senna, Hülkenberg and Grosjean.

Qualifying race classification

Warm-up
A 20-minute warm-up session was held on the morning of the main race. Jarvis lapped fastest with a time of 2 minutes, 11.516 seconds in the session's final minute, with Oshima nearly two-tenths of a second from his time. Grosjean, Hartley, Buemi, Tsukakoshi, Streit, Mortara, Buurman and Asmer followed in positions three to ten. Guerrieri was the only driver not to set any lap times during the session. Senna's left thumb was bruised from his qualification race crash the previous day and was forced to withdraw from the remainder of the race meeting after he was transported to hospital for precautionary checks which revealed his injury.

Main race

The race began on 18 November at 15:35 local time. When the Grand Prix started from its standing start, Jarvis ran with little wing angle to give him an advantage in the highland part of the circuit. This allowed him to make a fast getaway and maintain the lead into the first corner. Asmer briefly drew alongside Jarvis off the line but fell to fourth behind Oshima and Bird soon after. Oshima attempted to overtake Jarvis but the latter fended him off and Oshima was forced to slow. The first retirement of the race came on the first lap when Buurman tried to gain ground but could not get any further than San Francisco Bend with three wheels attached to his vehicle. On lap two, Breen became the second driver to withdraw from the race when another driver hit him from behind and put him into the tyre wall. At the front, Jarvis steadily opened up an lead over Oshima. Asmer ran in the slipstream of Bird's car heading down the main straight and he retook the third position from him in the braking zone for Lisboa corner at the start on the lap.

Oshima's advantage over Asmer had been reduced before Oshima responded by going faster to draw slightly closer to Jarvis on the next lap. Further down the field, Jelley lost a place to Tsukakoshi and Streit overtook Jakes as the latter was pushing hard early in the race. Streit then gained another place with an pass on Jelley while Mailleux overtook Jakes. Grosjean also progressed through the field, and was at this point in 14th place, passing Grubmüller without heavy resistance. Streit overtook Bird on lap three as Grosjean passed Mustonen. Soon after, Mustonen struck the barrier at Solitude corner and was forced into the pit lane for repairs before retiring. Buemi and Kobayashi recovered from the rear of the grid with Buemi in 14th with successive overtakes on Grubmüller and Mustonen. Meanwhile, Hartley passed Kennard to move into the top ten. Grosjean's faster speed moved him past Van Dam for 12th. Asmer set a new official lap record of the Guia Circuit at 2 minutes, 11.744 seconds on the sixth lap. The safety car was necessitated on lap seven due to Mailleux crashing heavily at Moorish Hill corner, damaging his car's left-hand side and was stranded in a dangerous position.

The safety car remained on track for three laps, until it was withdrawn at the start of lap 11. Jarvis maintained the lead at the restart. Oshima tried to pass Jarvis but became aware of his cold tyres. Tsukakoshi overtook Asmer for third heading towards Mandarin Bend, and immediately set about on capitalising on Oshima's error. Grosjean moved to eighth place, while Kennard became the race's final retirement when he struck the barrier at Lisboa corner, possibly caused by him being caught off guard on cold tyres. Tsukakoshi overtook Oshima on the outside heading towards Lisboa corner to claim second from his fellow countryman. Tsukakoshi then set himself after Jarvis while Mortara overtook Hartley for tenth. However, Jarvis maintained the first position for the rest of the event to win the Grand Prix and led all of the laps contested in the main race. Tsukakoshi followed 1.7 seconds later in second, while fellow Japanese driver Oshima took third. Off the podium, Asmer could not catch Oshima and settled for fourth. Streit and Bird were close behind each other in fifth and sixth with Jakes seventh. The top ten was rounded out by Grosjean, Jelley and Mortara. Outside the top ten, Buemi finished 11th, having moved up 17 from his starting position. He was ahead of Hartley, Kobayashi, Van Dam, Guerrieri, Izawa, Van Der Zande, Grubmüller. Local drivers Ávila, Cheong, Lei, Merszei. Hülkenberg and Ho rounded out the 24 classified finishers and Jarvis lapped them.

Main race classification

Notes:
  – Bruno Senna did not start the Grand Prix after being ruled out with a bruised left thumb.

References

External links
 

Macau
Macau Grand Prix
Macau Grand Prix
Macau Grand Prix Formula Three